Frank Thomas Smith (April 4, 1928 – September 24, 2005) was a professional baseball player. Born in Pierrepont Manor, New York, he was a right-handed pitcher over parts of seven seasons (1950–56) with the Cincinnati Reds (also called the Redlegs in 1953–56) and the St. Louis Cardinals. During his career, he compiled a 35–33 record in 271 appearances, mostly as a relief pitcher, with a 3.81 earned run average, 277 strikeouts, and 44 saves.

Smith died at his Malone, Florida home on September 24, 2005.

References

External links

1928 births
2005 deaths
Major League Baseball pitchers
Baseball players from New York (state)
Cincinnati Reds players
Cincinnati Redlegs players
St. Louis Cardinals players
People from Ellisburg, New York
People from Jackson County, Florida
Statesville Cubs players
Marion Cubs players
Columbia Reds players
Tulsa Oilers (baseball) players
Nashville Vols players